is a Japanese politician of the Liberal Democratic Party, a member of the House of Representatives in the Diet (national legislature). A native of Hyogo and graduate of Konan University, she was elected for the first time in 2005.

References 
 

Members of the House of Representatives (Japan)
Female members of the House of Representatives (Japan)
Koizumi Children
Politicians from Hyōgo Prefecture
Living people
1953 births
Liberal Democratic Party (Japan) politicians
21st-century Japanese women politicians